The 2012 Davidson Wildcats football team represented Davidson College in the 2012 NCAA Division I FCS football season. They were led by eighth-year head coach Tripp Merritt and played their home games at Richardson Stadium. They were a member of the Pioneer Football League (PFL). Merritt was fired on November 5 after a 1–8 start and 31–51 mark in eight seasons. Associate head coach Brett Hayford was named the interim head coach for the remainder of the season. They finished the season 2–9 overall  2–6 in PFL play to finish in eighth place.

Schedule

References

Davidson
Davidson Wildcats football seasons
Davidson Wildcats football